The Weingarten equations give the expansion of the derivative of the unit normal vector to a surface in terms of the first derivatives of the position vector of a point on the surface. These formulas were established in 1861 by the German mathematician Julius Weingarten.

Statement in classical differential geometry
Let S be a surface in three-dimensional Euclidean space that is parametrized by the position vector r(u, v). Let P = P(u, v) be a point on the surface. Then

are two tangent vectors at point P.

Let n(u, v) be the unit normal vector and let (E, F, G) and (L, M, N) be the coefficients of the first and second fundamental forms of this surface, respectively. The Weingarten equation gives the first derivative of the unit normal vector n at point P in terms of the tangent vectors ru and rv:

This can be expressed compactly in index notation as 

,

where Kab are the components of the surface's second fundamental form (shape tensor).

Notes

References
 
 Springer Encyclopedia of Mathematics, Weingarten derivational formulas
 
 Erwin Kreyszig, Differential Geometry, Dover Publications, 1991, section 45.

Differential geometry of surfaces